William H. Gibson may refer to:

 William Harvey Gibson (1821–1894), politician from Ohio and Union Army general
 William H. Gibson (educator) (1829–1906), educator and community organizer in Louisville, Kentucky